Ema Wolf (born May 4, 1948) is an Argentine writer and journalist. She has written numerous children's books and won the Premio Alfaguara for her book El turno del escriba, co-written with Graciela Montes.

References

1948 births
Living people
Argentine women children's writers
People from Buenos Aires
Argentine women journalists